Hogs Back Brewery is a hops-growing brewery in Tongham, United Kingdom.  In 2013, Miles Chesterman was the head brewer and Rupert Thompson was the chairman.

In June 2014, Magners released their Cider Hog, a "portable cider dispenser" with a name and graphics similar to Hogs Back's own Hazy Hog cider, released 15 months prior.  Concerned about trademark infringement, Hogs Back communicated with Magners for six months without an acceptable resolution, and so in February 2015 the Tongham brewery initiated legal action against the larger company.  C&C Group disputer Hogs Back's claims.

The following year, Hogs Back Brewery was expected to spend  on a traditional oast house (the first built in the UK in over 100 years). During the eleven months the kiln isn't drying hops, it will be "an event space and visitor centre, educating people about the local hop farming industry which Hogs Back is helping to revive."

Products

Premiering in 2013, the Hogstar lager was fermented longer than contemporary lagers, resulting in what Hogs Back called "the traditional way to round out and balance 'lager' beers. Carbonation develops naturally and we do not pasteurise." This new unpasteurised British lager hoped to succeed on the coattails of Pilsner Urquell, a Londoner lager that helped Plzeňský Prazdroj, a. s. grow 17% in the first half of 2013.

In partnership with Montezuma's, a chocolate lager was released in 2014.  Though the reviewers with All About Beer called the bronze beer a novelty, the chocolate flavor was described as surprisingly good on its own merits.

References

External links
 

Breweries in England
Companies based in Surrey